Cahill ministry may refer to:
 Cahill ministry (1952–1953)
 Cahill ministry (1953–1956)
 Cahill ministry (1956–1959)
 Cahill ministry (1959)